Annascaul GAA Club (Irish: Cumann Lúthchleas Gael Abhainn an Scáil ) is a Gaelic Athletic Association club that plays Gaelic football and is based in Annascaul, County Kerry, Ireland. They play in Division 2 of the County Football League and in the Kerry Junior Football Championship. Annascaul is formed by three communities- Annascaul, Inch and Camp. Camp has the proud distinction of having the most All-Ireland medals per head of population of any village in Ireland. There are reports of Hurling being played in the area during the early part of the 20th century.

History

The Annascaul team was set up in the early 1920s and it has had much success over the years; the most recent coming between 1981 and 1993 when the club won three Kerry Intermediate Football Championship, one Kerry County Football League - Division 1, four West Kerry Senior Football Championship, and one County Club Championship. The club played in one County Championship final, one Kerry Intermediate Football Championship, and two West Kerry Senior Football Championship finals.

Since 2000, the club has won the Kerry Junior Football Championship, Kerry Intermediate Football Championship, Munster Intermediate Club Football Championship, County League Division 2, a West Kerry Senior Football Championship and two West Kerry Leagues. They have also played in two other Kerry Intermediate Football Championship finals, one West Kerry Senior Football Championship Final, two West Kerry League Finals, two West Kerry Minor Championship Finals, and one Munster Junior Club Football Championship Final.

In 1993, the club played in the Kerry Senior Football Championship for the first time and made it to the final, where shorn of many of their star players due to injury, lost out to Laune Rangers. There were some notable wins along the way, including a first round win over then holders Mid Kerry and over locals West Kerry in the semi-final.

The club was the first in the county to have a weekly lottery.

The club's home ground is named after Paddy Kennedy who played for Kerry in the 1930s and 1940s. Regarded by many as one of the all-time greats of Kerry football, he was captain of the 1946 All-Ireland winning team. The pitch was opened in 1984; the first game played there was between Kerry and Dublin. Since then, there have been many West Kerry League championship games and finals played there by all age groups as well as many County League championships. In 2003, the Munster Ladies Minor Football Championship final between Kerry and Cork was played there. In 2008, a round of the Ladies National League was played between Kerry and Mayo

Roll of honour

 Kerry Senior Football Championship (Runners Up):1993
 County Club Champions: Winners (1) 1989(Runners up)1991
 Kerry Intermediate Football Championship: Winners (4) 1982, 1987, 1992, 2007
 Munster Intermediate Club Football Championship: Winners (1) 2007
 Kerry Junior Football Championship: Winners (3)  1979, 2003, 2020
 Munster Junior Club Football Championship Runners-up 2004
 Kerry Novice Football Championship Winners (1) 1976
 Kerry County Football League - Division 1: (1) 1991
 County League Division 2: Winners (2)1987, 2003
 County League Division 3: (2) Winners 1976,1984
 West Kerry Senior Football Championship: Winners (6) 1957, 1988, 1989, 1990, 1992, 2009

Inter-County players
Tommy Doyle: Vocational Minor, U21, Senior
Paddy Kennedy: Minor, Senior
Bingo O'Driscoll: U21, Senior(Kerry), Senior(New York)

Famous players
Tommy Doyle
Paddy Kennedy
Bingo O'Driscoll
Sean Murphy

External links
- Annascaul Village Website

Gaelic games clubs in County Kerry
Gaelic football clubs in County Kerry
1920s establishments in Ireland